Warwick Slow is a New Zealand radio DJ and media personality from Wellington, New Zealand. Formerly employed by Hit Radio X105, he regularly appeared on the station's night weekend shifts, before the station's closure in September 2010.

Slow gained notoriety because of a stunt that he undertook for the X105 radio station in which he managed to gatecrash a royal barbecue which was being held for Prince William, at Premier House in Wellington. His goal was to provide the visiting prince with 'Sizzlers', a type of sausage, and buttered bread, however Slow mistimed his entrance and was removed by police before Prince William arrived.

Early life 
Warwick grew up in Wellington, living in Titahi Bay and Tawa during most of his childhood. He attended Onslow College, and went on to attend the New Zealand Radio Training School, from which he graduated. He then began an internship with a new Wellington-based radio station named Hit Radio X105 in late 2009.

Royal barbecue and controversy 
On the 18th of January 2010, Slow attempted to provide Prince William with sausages and bread at an official royal barbecue, which took place at Premier House in Wellington. After attempting, and failing, to enter the Prime Minister's residence through the main entrance, Slow climbed over a fence and proceeded through the foliage to the main party area, posing as catering staff and asking several guests where he should put the sausages and bread that he was carrying. The entire event was broadcast live on X105 via Slow's cellphone. After entering the ministerial residence, he was spotted and apprehended by New Zealand police and was escorted off the premises for questioning.

The packet of 'Sizzler' sausages used in the incident were later auctioned off on New Zealand auction website TradeMe.

Although Prince William had not yet arrived at the venue, and Slow posed no perceivable threat to the royal, the incident left the New Zealand Police embarrassed that such a major breach of security was possible, especially considering the high stature of persons present at the barbecue.

New Zealand police chose not to lay charges on Slow for the incident, saying that they accept he did not intend to commit any criminal acts whilst on the property, though he has been issued with a trespass notice barring him from Premier House for two years. A review of security procedures was conducted which also concerned future royal visits. Wellington Police Area Commander Pete Cowan stated that: "Future royal visits to this country will see increased security, increased personal protection".

References 

New Zealand DJs
People educated at Onslow College
1990 births
Living people